Igor Dvornik (9 May 1923, Split – 21 August 2010, Zagreb) was a Croatian radiation chemist.

Dvornik proposed and developed two original chemical dosimetry systems based on ethanol-chlorobenzene solutions of which the one designed for high-doses is accepted as an ISO standard and is one of the most widely used dosimetry systems. His work in understanding high hydrochloric acid yield of the ethanol-chlorobenzene dosimeter led to him being among the first to propose the existence of presolvated 'dry' electron reactions.

References

1923 births
2010 deaths
Croatian chemists
Faculty of Science, University of Zagreb alumni
Academic staff of the University of Zagreb
Yugoslav scientists